Nossa Senhora da Conceição is a parish in the municipality of Angra do Heroísmo on the island of Terceira in the Azores. The population in 2011 was 3,717, in an area of 2.44 km².

Notable natives
Helder Antunes

References

Freguesias of Angra do Heroísmo